

History
Aghamohammad Garden House is an ancient, splendid garden house in the middle of Kashan with amazing view, and was built in 1330 (Solar year) by the late Agha Muhammad Eftekhar.

It is an eye-catching large garden with many trees that have spread around the garden. Limpid water streams flow through the belvedere. A two-storey building which is a magnificent example of combining art and architecture, good weather of spring with the scent of roses, silence of nights and pleasant sounds of birds at days are considered as outstanding features of Agha Muhammad Belvedere.

Architectural Features of the Structure

The architect of this structure is Master Abbass Ali Ghaffar Ghamsari. This two-storey building has a total area of 150 square meters with a height of 6.5 meters. The area of the garden is also 1300 square meters. Materials used in the construction (Clay, Soil and wood) are all from the own region.

Moreover, gorgeous symmetry and similarity of the two halves of the building with a high, roofed porch which is adorned with wooden windows are of the core features of this amazing structure. 
Doors and windows are all wooden made by late Agha Muhhamad Naserinejad Ghamsari and his son Haj Abbass Naserinejad Ghamsari. They are made from walnut wood and are dark brown.

Buildings and structures in Kashan